This is a list of Members of Parliament (MPs) elected to the House of Commons of the United Kingdom by Welsh constituencies for the fifty-seventh Parliament of the United Kingdom (2017 to 2019).

It includes both MPs elected at the 2017 general election, held on 8 June 2017, and those subsequently elected in by-elections. At the 2017 general election, Welsh Labour was the largest party with 28 MPs. Conservatives were 2nd with 8 MPs and Plaid Cymru had 4.

The list is sorted by the name of the MP, and MPs who did not serve throughout the Parliament are italicised. New MPs elected since the general election are noted at the bottom of the page.

Composition

MPs

By-elections
2019 Newport West by-election
2019 Brecon and Radnorshire by-election

See also
 2017 United Kingdom general election
 List of MPs elected in the 2017 United Kingdom general election
 List of MPs for constituencies in England (2017–2019)
 List of MPs for constituencies in Northern Ireland (2017–2019)
 List of MPs for constituencies in Scotland (2017–2019)

Notes

References

Wales
2017-
MPs